Smoky Drain is a stream in the U.S. state of West Virginia.

Smoky Drain was named for a family of settlers near the creek, all of whom were heavy smokers.

See also
List of rivers of West Virginia

References

Rivers of Monongalia County, West Virginia
Rivers of West Virginia